, also written as 2006 QH181, is a trans-Neptunian object (TNO) in the scattered disc. Its orbit is currently too poorly determined (U=6) to know whether it is in a resonance with Neptune.

Distance 

It came to perihelion around 1858. The only large objects currently farther from the Sun are Eris (96.1 AU),  (90.9 AU),  (~89 AU), Gonggong (88.0 AU), Sedna (85.1 AU),  (84.8 AU), and  (84.7 AU). Because it is so far from the Sun, it only has an apparent magnitude of 23.6.

Orbit 
It has been observed 15 times over only three oppositions and thus currently has a somewhat poorly known orbit.

See also
List of Solar System objects most distant from the Sun

References

External links 
 
 

Minor planet object articles (unnumbered)

20060821